The 2008 FIBA Europe Under-18 Championship was an international basketball  competition held in Greece from July 25, 2008 until August 3. The hosts, Greeks, emerged as the champions after beating the Lithuanians in the final, 57–50 to clinch their first European Under-18 championship. The tournament served as the European Qualifiers for the 2009 FIBA Under-19 World Championship.

Participating teams

Squads

At the start of tournament, all 16 participating countries will have 12 players on their roster.

Venues

Format 
 PRELIMINARY ROUND: 4 groups of 4 teams each, playing in a single round-robin elimination. The top 3 teams advance to the second round while the last placed team being eliminated.
 SECOND ROUND: 12 teams left will be divided into 2 groups of six teams. All of the results earned from the second round shall be carried over to this round. The top two teams in both groups qualify for the semifinals and to the 2009 FIBA Under-19 Basketball World Cup. The remaining teams then proceed to their respective classification playoffs.
 FINAL ROUND: 
 4-team knockout stage for the CHAMPIONSHIP;
 4-team knockout stage for 5th–8th place classification playoffs;
 4-team knockout stage for 9th–12th place classification playoffs.

Preliminary round
Teams are divided equally in 4 groups of four teams each and they will play in a single round-robin format. The top three teams in each group qualified for the second round while the last teams in each group were eliminated.

All times are local, UTC+3.

Group A

Group B

Group C

Group D

Second round

Group E

Group F

Classification playoffs

9th–12th place classification playoffs

Classification Semifinals

Eleventh place match

Ninth place match

5th–8th place classification playoffs

Classification Semifinals

Seventh place match

Fifth place match 
Winner qualified for the World Cup.

Final round 
All times are local, UTC+3.

Semifinals

Bronze medal match

Final

Final standings
The top 5 teams qualified for the 2009 FIBA Under-19 World Championship.

Awards

All-Tournament Team

 Mario Delas
 Kostas Sloukas
 Nikos Pappas
 Enes Kanter
 Donatas Motiejūnas

External links
Official website

FIBA U18 European Championship
2008–09 in European basketball
2008–09 in Greek basketball
International youth basketball competitions hosted by Greece